KSPQ (93.9 FM, "Q94") is a radio station licensed to serve West Plains, Missouri, United States.  The station is owned by Ozark Radio Network.

KSPQ broadcasts a classic rock format branded as "Q94".

KSPQ is the local affiliate for the Nights with Alice Cooper radio show, hosted by longtime singer/songwriter Alice Cooper. As well, as the Mizzou Tigers basketball programming.

The station was assigned the KSPQ call sign by the Federal Communications Commission on January 1, 1988.

References

External links
KSPQ official website
Ozark Radio Network

SPQ
Classic rock radio stations in the United States
Howell County, Missouri
Radio stations established in 1952